More4 News was a daily news programme on the More4 digital television channel in the United Kingdom, airing Monday to Friday from 8.00pm to 8.30pm from 2005 to 2009.

History
More4 News launched at the inception of the More4 channel on 10 October 2005. As a consequence of the advertising slowdown during the 2009 recession, the programme was cancelled, the last broadcast airing on 18 December 2009.
It was the sister programme of the Channel 4 News and was nominated by the Royal Television Society as the News Programme of the Year, 2007.

Production Team

Anchors
Alex Thomson

Kylie Morris

Sarah Smith

Krishnan Guru-Murthy

Keme Nzerem

Editor
David Mapstone

Assistant Editor
Mick Hodgkin

Film Executive
Iain Overton

Producers/Directors
Andrew Thomas
Nima Elbagir
Girish Juneja
Nina Teggarty
Harry Anscombe
Helene Cacace
David Fuller
Rags Martel

Producers
Samantha Haque
Simon Stanleigh

References

External links

ITN.co.uk

Channel 4 original programming
British television news shows
ITN
2005 British television series debuts
2009 British television series endings